The current list of ancient Olympic victors contains all of the known victors of the ancient Olympic Games from the 1st Games in 776 BC up to 264th in 277 AD, as well as the games of 369 AD before their permanent disbandment in 393 by Roman emperor Theodosius I. It is  based on available modern sources, as well as the older ones such as the writings of Pausanias (2nd century AD) and Chronicle of Eusebius (3rd century AD).

Completeness
The complete number of sports that were carried out in each iteration of the Games is unknown, as is the number of victors that took part in these. Also, the correlation between victors and cities may not always be true, as it was not uncommon during antiquity for some ancient writers to make up or distort an olympic victor's city so that the given city would gain the glory and fame that accompanied an athlete's victory.

Up to the 2nd century BC and the beginning of 1st century BC, the athletes were Greek, as per the prerequisite for participating in the Games, however starting from the end of 1st century BC more and more Roman names appear as a consequence of the Roman rule in the Hellenic world. A measure of the level of uncertainty that exists today with regard to who the majority of the ancient Olympic victors were, is the approximation that from a total of more than 3,500 probable victors in different olympic sports during the ancient Olympic Games, only about 800 of them are known today.

List

See also 
 Ancient Olympic Games
 Olympic winners of the Archaic period
 Ancient Greek Olympic festivals
 Hellanodikai

Notes

References

Sources
 Arete: Greek Sports from Ancient Sources, Stephen G. Miller, University of California Press, 2 Aug 2012
 Sports in the Ancient World, from A to Z, Mark Golden, Routledge, 1 Jun 2004
 Renson, R., Laummer, M., Riordan J. et al. (eds.), The Olympic Games Through the Ages: Greek Antiquity and its Impact on Modern Sport, Athens 1991.
 Young, D.C., The Origins of Modern Olympics: A New Version, International Journal of the History of Sports, 3 (1987), 271–300
 L. Moretti, Olympionikai, i vincitori negli Antichi agoni Olimpici, MemLinc, Roma, 1957; L. Moretti, "Supplemento al catalogo degli Olympionikai," Klio 52, 1970, pp. 295– 303.

Ancient Olympic Games
.
Olympic victors
Lists of Olympic medalists
Olympic victors